This article provides details of international football games played by the Latvia national football team from its reestablishment in 1991 to 2019.

Results

1991

1992

1993

1994

1995

1996

1997

1998

1999

2000

2001

2002

2003

2004

2005

2006

2007

2008

2009

2010

2011

2012

2013

2014

2015

2016

2017

2018

2019

References

Latvia national football team